Qush Qayehsi (also Romanized as Qūsh Qayehsī; also known as Qūsh Tappehsī) is a village in Quri Chay-ye Gharbi Rural District, Saraju District, Maragheh County, East Azerbaijan Province, Iran. At the 2006 census, its population was 137, in 27 families.

References 

Towns and villages in Maragheh County